Happy Now is the ninth studio album by English post-punk band Gang of Four, self-released on 19 April 2019, and their most recent album as of 2022. The release has received mildly positive reviews. It is the band's final album before the 2020 death of guitarist Andy Gill, who was then the only original band member, though in 2021 Gang of Four re-united with two of four original members.

Critical reception
 The editorial staff of AllMusic Guide gave the album four out of five stars, with reviewer Mark Deming writing, "this is taut, effective music that honors Gang of Four's heritage but succeeds on its own terms". In Under the Radar, Mischa Pearlman's review praises the music's social and political relevance, giving it a seven out of 10.

Track listing
All songs written by Andy Gill, except where noted: 	
"Toreador" – 3:34
"Alpha Male" – 4:33
"One True Friend" – 4:24
"Ivanka: 'My Name's on It'" – 3:52
"Don't Ask Me" (Andy Gill, John "Gaoler" Sterry) – 3:41
"Change the Locks" (Andy Gill, Catherine Mayer) – 4:07
"I'm a Liar" – 4:09
"White Lies" (Andy Gill, Catherine Mayer) – 3:43
"Paper Thin" (Andy Gill, Catherine Mayer) – 3:38
"Lucky" – 4:40

Personnel
Gang of Four
Andy Gill – guitar, vocals, production, artwork
Tobias Humble – drums on "Toreador", "Ivanka: 'My Name's on It'" and "Lucky"
Thomas McNeice – bass guitar on "Alpha Male", "One True Friend", "Change the Locks", "I am a Liar" and "Paper Thin"

Additional personnel
Natalie Alexis Duncan – backing vocals on "Lucky"
Lawrie Dunster – mastering
Jonny Finnigan – drums on "Alpha Male", "Change the Locks" and "Paper Thin"
Ben Hillier – bass guitar on "Toreador", mixing on "Toreador" and "Lucky", production on "Toreador", "Ivanka: 'My Name's on It'" and "Lucky"
Amy Love – backing vocals on "Alpha Male", "One True Friend", "Ivanka: 'My Name's on It'" and "White Lies"
Catherine Mayer – mixing on "One True Friend", "Change the Locks", "White Lies" and "Paper Thin"; production on "One True Friend", "Change the Locks", "White Lies" and "Paper Thin"
Rhys Oakes – programming on "Alpha Male" and "Ivanka: 'My Name's on It'"
Ross Orton – bass guitar on "Don't Ask Me"; mixing on "Alpha Male", "Ivanka: 'My Name's on It'" and "I'm a Liar"; production on "I'm a Liar"
Jane Sasseen – vocal sampling on "Alpha Male"
Leigh Smiler – artwork
Rebeka Ubuntu – backing vocals on "Lucky"

References

External links

2019 albums
Albums produced by Andy Gill
Self-released albums
Gang of Four (band) albums
Albums produced by Ben Hillier